Wazed Ali Choudhury is an Indian politician. He was elected to the Assam Legislative Assembly from Salmara South in the 2021 Assam Legislative Assembly election.

References

Living people
21st-century Indian politicians
1959 births
Indian National Congress politicians from Assam